Zheleznodorozhnaya Kazarma 193 km is a rural locality (a station) in Sibirsky Selsoviet, Pervomaysky District, Altai Krai, Russia. The population was 33 as of 2013. There is 1 street.

Geography 
The station is located 23 km from Novoaltaysk, 51 km from Barnaul.

References 

Rural localities in Pervomaysky District, Altai Krai